Amir Feratovič (born 8 June 2002) is a Slovenian footballer who plays as a defender for Portuguese side Benfica B on loan from Estrela da Amadora.

Club career
Born in Ljubljana, Feratovič started his career with local side Olimpija Ljubljana before joining Bravo.

International career
Feratovič has represented Slovenia at all youth international levels from under-16 to under-21.

Career statistics

Club

References

2002 births
Living people
Footballers from Ljubljana
Slovenian footballers
Slovenia youth international footballers
Slovenia under-21 international footballers
Association football defenders
Liga Portugal 2 players
NK Olimpija Ljubljana (2005) players
NK Bravo players
A.S. Roma players
C.F. Estrela da Amadora players
S.L. Benfica B players
Slovenian expatriate footballers
Slovenian expatriate sportspeople in Italy
Expatriate footballers in Italy
Slovenian expatriate sportspeople in Portugal
Expatriate footballers in Portugal